Ichnotropis is a genus of African lizards in the family Lacertidae. Species in the genus Ichnotropis are commonly called rough-scaled lizards.

Species
The following six species are recognized as being valid.
Ichnotropis bivittata Bocage, 1866 - Angolan rough-scaled lizard
Ichnotropis capensis (A. Smith, 1838) - Cape rough-scaled lizard, ornate rough-scaled lizard, Smith's rough-scaled sand lizard
Ichnotropis chapini K.P. Schmidt, 1919
Ichnotropis grandiceps Broadley, 1967 - Caprivi rough-scaled lizard
Ichnotropis microlepidota Marx, 1956 - Marx's rough-scaled lizard 
Ichnotropis tanganicana Boulenger, 1917 - Tanzanian rough-scaled lizard,

Nota bene: A binomial authority in parentheses indicates that the species was originally described in a genus other than Ichnotropis.

References

Further reading
Boulenger GA (1887). Catalogue of the Lizards in the British Museum (Natural History). Second Edition. Volume III. Lacertidae, ... London: Trustees of the British Museum (Natural History). (Taylor and Francis, printers). xii + 575 pp. + Plates I-XL. (Genus Ichnotropis, p. 78).
Branch, Bill (2004). Field Guide to Snakes and other Reptiles of Southern Africa. Third Revised edition, Second Impression. Sanibel Island, Florida: Ralph Curtis Books. 399 pp. . (Genus Ichnotropis, p. 162).
Peters W (1854). "Diagnosen neuer Batrachier, welche zusammen mit der früher (24. Juli und 17. August) gegebenen Übersicht der Schlangen und Eidechsen mitgetheilt werden ". Bericht über die zur Bekanntmachung geeigneten Verhandlung der Königl. Preuss. Akademie der Wissenschaften zu Berlin 1854: 614–628. (Ichnotropis, new genus, p. 617). (in German and Latin).

 
Lizard genera
Taxa named by Wilhelm Peters